Mateusz Maurycy Śmierzchalski (born 18 July 1982, Gdynia, Poland), stage name Havoc, is a Polish heavy metal musician. He is best known for being the former rhythm guitarist for Behemoth. Since 1999, he is lead guitarist of the sludge-doom metal band Blindead.

Mateusz Śmierzchalski is endorsed by Mayones.

Discography

Behemoth
Live Eschaton (2000, VHS, Metal Mind Records)
Thelema.6 (2000, Avantgarde Music)
Antichristian Phenomenon (2000, Avantgarde Music)
Zos Kia Cultus (2002, Avantgarde Music)
Conjuration (2003, Regain Records)
Crush.Fukk.Create: Requiem for Generation Armageddon (2004, DVD, Regain Records)
Abyssus Abyssum Invocat (2011, Peaceville Records)

Seagulls Insane and Swans Deceased Mining Out the Void
 Seagulls Insane and Swans Deceased Mining Out the Void (2011, Witching Hour Productions)

References

 

1982 births
Living people
Behemoth (band) members
Black metal musicians
Polish heavy metal guitarists
Polish heavy metal singers
20th-century Polish male  singers
Polish male guitarists